Josh Canham is an Australian rugby union player who plays for the  in Super Rugby. His playing position is lock. He was named in the Rebels wider-training squad for the 2022 Super Rugby Pacific season.

Super Rugby statistics

Reference list

External links
itsrugby.co.uk profile

Australian rugby union players
Living people
Rugby union locks
Melbourne Rebels players
Year of birth missing (living people)